Estadio Resurgimiento is a stadium located in Ciudad del Carmen, Mexico.  It is primarily used for baseball, and was the home field of the Delfines del Carmen Mexican League baseball club from 2011 through 2016. It has a seating capacity of 8,200 spectators.

References 

Baseball venues in Mexico
Sports venues completed in 1967